Dance or Die with a Vengeance is a remix album from the band Family Force 5. The album was released on May 19, 2009 both in stores and via digital distribution. The album debuted at No. 180 on the Billboard 200, No. 15 on the Christian Albums chart and No. 6 on the Dance/Electronic albums chart.

The album
The band debuted the remix album Dance or Die with a Vengeance with remixes by The Secret Handshake ("Dance or Die"), Sean Foreman of 3OH!3 ("Get Your Back Off the Wall"), Danger Radio, Jasen Rauch of Red ("Radiator"), Matt Thiessen of Relient K ("The First Time"), David Crowder of David Crowder Band ("How in the World"), Alex Suarez of Cobra Starship ("How in the World"), Lauren Olds, who is the wife of Soul Glow Activator ("Wake the Dead"), and others. Adam Young of Owl City was a candidate for being one of the remixers of the album but was busy recording his own album, Ocean Eyes.

Track listing

Charts

References

2009 remix albums
Tooth & Nail Records remix albums
Family Force 5 albums